Onustus is a genus of large sea snails, marine gastropod mollusks in the family Xenophoridae, the carrier shells.

Description
Shells medium-sized to large (diameter of base without attachments 80–160 mm; height of shell 42–100 mm), thin-shelled, with wide peripheral flange, simple or weakly digitate, porcellanous ventrally. Umbilicus narrow to wide, sometimes plugged with callus. Foreign objects attached to periphery on few to all whorls, usually small and inconspicuous, leaving most of the shell surface exposed.

Species
Species within the genus Onustus include:

Onustus caribaeus (Petit de la Saussaye, 1857)
Onustus exutus (Reeve, 1842)
Onustus indicus (Gmelin, 1791)
Onustus longleyi Bartsch, 1931

References

External links

Xenophoridae